Two ships of the Royal Navy have been named HMS Cleveland:

  was a Royal Yacht launched in 1671 at Portsmouth Dockyard. She was sold in 1716.
  was a Hunt-class destroyer launched in 1940 and stranded while under tow to be scrapped in 1957.

Royal Navy ship names